Pierre Albertini may refer to:
 Pierre Albertini (politician) (born 1944), French politician
 Pierre Albertini (judoka) (1942–2017), French judoka